Manit Noywech (born March 5, 1980) is a Thai retired footballer. He is a former striker of Thailand national team and scored 6 goals for the national team and he known as Rivaldo of Thailand.

Honours

Club
Suphanburi F.C.
 Provincial League: 2002

Insee Police United F.C.
 Thai Division 1 League: 2009

Ayutthaya F.C.
 Regional League Division 2: 2012

International
Thailand U23
 Sea Games Gold medal: 2001, 2003
 Asian Games 4th place: 2002

International goals

References

External links 
 
 

1980 births
Living people
Manit Noywech
Manit Noywech
Manit Noywech
Manit Noywech
Manit Noywech
Manit Noywech
Manit Noywech
Thai expatriate footballers
Thai expatriate sportspeople in Indonesia
Expatriate footballers in Indonesia
Indonesian Premier Division players
Persijap Jepara players
Thai expatriate sportspeople in Vietnam
Expatriate footballers in Vietnam
Association football forwards
Footballers at the 2002 Asian Games
Manit Noywech
Southeast Asian Games medalists in football
Competitors at the 2001 Southeast Asian Games
Competitors at the 2003 Southeast Asian Games
Manit Noywech
Manit Noywech